This is a list of New York City borough halls and municipal buildings used for civic agencies. Each of the borough halls serve as offices for their respective borough presidents and borough boards.

 New York City Hall
 Manhattan Municipal Building, Civic Center
 Bronx County Courthouse, Concourse, Bronx
 Brooklyn Borough Hall, Downtown Brooklyn
 Queens Borough Hall, Kew Gardens
 Staten Island Borough Hall, St. George

Former
 Bronx Borough Hall

See also
 Borough president
 Government of New York City
 Gracie Mansion
 Mayor of New York City

 
New York City Borough Halls and municipal buildings
Borough Halls and municipal buildings